Manser is a surname. Notable people with the surname include:

 Anthony Manser (1924–1995), British philosopher
 Bruno Manser (1954–presumably 2000), Swiss anthropologist and activist
 Harry Manser (1874–1955), justice of the Maine Supreme Judicial Court
 Kevin Manser (1929–2001), Australian actor
 Leslie Manser (1922–1942), British bomber pilot
 Manser Marmion (1404–?), English politician
 Michael Manser (1929–2016), British architect
 Pauline Manser (born 1969), Australian volleyball coach
 Riaan Manser (born 1973), South African explorer
 Robert Manser (1880–1955), English first-class cricketer
 Thérès Manser (born 1956), Swiss sport shooter

See also
 Cecil Victor Manser, better known as Charlie Chester, English comedian and TV and radio presenter